"You Are What I Am" is a song by Gordon Lightfoot, released on the 1972 Old Dan's Records album.

Chart performance

References

Gordon Lightfoot songs
1972 songs
Songs written by Gordon Lightfoot
1972 singles
Reprise Records singles
Song recordings produced by Lenny Waronker